Mohammed Saleh Abdulla Al Sada was the minister of energy and industry of Qatar and the chairman of Qatar Petroleum.

Education
Sada graduated from the Qatar University with a Bachelor of Science degree in marine science and geology. He also holds a MSc and a PhD from the University of Manchester Institute of Science and Technology.

Career
Al Sada started his career at Qatar Petroleum in 1983. He served in various positions and was appointed as technical director of Qatar Petroleum in 1997. From 2006 to 2011 he served as the managing director of RasGas liquefied natural gas company. He is also the vice chairman of the board of the Qatar Chemical Company (Q-Chem) and Qatar Steel Company (QASCO), and the chairman of the board of directors of Qatar Metals Coating Company (Q-Coat). He has served as a member of the Qatar's permanent constitution preparation committee, the supreme education council, and the national committee for human rights.

In April 2007, Al Sada was appointed minister of state for energy and industry affairs and served in that position until 2011.

On 18 January 2011, he replaced Abdullah bin Hamad Al Attiyah in the post of minister of industry and energy. On 14 February 2011, he was appointed as chairman of the board and managing director of Qatar Petroleum. On 24 February 2011, he became the chairman of the RasGas's board of directors.

Al Sada remained unchanged in the cabinet reshuffle in June 2013, which saw the change of the prime minister. Therefore, he was part of the cabinet led by prime minister Abdullah bin Nasser bin Khalifa Al Thani.

Al Sada was chairman of Nakilat (Qatar Gas Transport Company). He was succeeded by Saad Sherida al-Kaabi.

Personal life
Al Sada is married and has two daughters and three sons.

Honors
 Grand Cordon of the Order of the Rising Sun (2020)

References

Living people
Qatar University alumni
Alumni of the University of Manchester Institute of Science and Technology
Energy ministers
People in the petroleum industry
Government ministers of Qatar
Year of birth missing (living people)
Grand Cordons of the Order of the Rising Sun